The 2011 Ethias Trophy was a professional tennis tournament played on hard courts. It was the seventh edition of the tournament which was part of the 2011 ATP Challenger Tour and the Tretorn SERIE+. It took place in Mons, Belgium between 3 and 9 October 2011.

ATP entrants

Seeds

 1 Rankings are as of September 26, 2011.

Other entrants
The following players received wildcards into the singles main draw:
  Maxime Authom
  David Goffin
  Xavier Malisse
  Yannick Mertens

The following players received entry from the qualifying draw:
  Jonathan Dasnières de Veigy
  Josh Goodall
  Conor Niland
  Michał Przysiężny

Champions

Singles

 Andreas Seppi def.  Julien Benneteau, 2–6, 6–3, 7–6(7–4)

Doubles

 Johan Brunström /  Ken Skupski def.  Kenny de Schepper /  Édouard Roger-Vasselin, 7–6(7–4), 6–3

External links
Official Website
ITF Search
ATP official site

 
Ethias Trophy
Ethias Trophy
Ethias Trophy